The Repast of the Lion is an early 20th century painting by French post-impressionist Henri Rousseau. Done in oil on canvas, the work depicts a feeding lion in a jungle setting. The painting expands upon some of Rousseau's late 19th century work Surprise!, and the foliage depicted in the painting was inspired by the artist's studying of Paris' botanical gardens. The work is currently on display at the Metropolitan Museum of Art.

References

1907 paintings
Paintings by Henri Rousseau
Paintings in the collection of the Metropolitan Museum of Art
Lions in art
Moon in art